The Delta Kappa Epsilon Fraternity House was a historic fraternity house located at the University of Illinois at Urbana–Champaign in Champaign, Illinois. The house was built in 1906 for the university's Delta Pi chapter of the Delta Kappa Epsilon fraternity. Architect E. G. Oldefest, a member of the chapter, designed the Tudor Revival building. The fraternity occupied the house until 1921, when the Alpha Sigma Phi fraternity purchased the building. Tau Delta Phi purchased the building from Alpha Sigma Phi in 1929; they occupied the house until 1940, when it became a private dormitory unaffiliated with Greek life. The building became a fraternity house again in the 1980s when it was purchased by Chi Phi.

The building was added to the National Register of Historic Places on February 22, 1990. The building was demolished in 2020 to make way for a new apartment building.

References

Residential buildings on the National Register of Historic Places in Illinois
Tudor Revival architecture in the United States
Houses completed in 1906
National Register of Historic Places in Champaign County, Illinois
Buildings and structures of the University of Illinois Urbana-Champaign
Fraternity and sorority houses
Buildings and structures in Champaign, Illinois
Delta Kappa Epsilon
1906 establishments in Illinois
Demolished buildings and structures in Illinois
Buildings and structures demolished in 2020